The 1940 Alberta general election was held on March 21, 1940, to elect members of the Legislative Assembly of Alberta.

Despite its failure to implement its key policy, providing prosperity certificates to all Albertans, the Social Credit Party of Premier William Aberhart won a second term in government. Nevertheless, it lost a considerable number of seats that it had gained in the 1935 landslide.

This provincial election, like the previous three, saw district-level proportional representation (Single transferable voting) used to elect the MLAs of Edmonton and Calgary. City-wide districts were used to elect multiple MLAs in the cities. All the other MLAs were elected in single-member districts through Instant-runoff voting.

Unity Movement
The Conservative and Liberal parties as well as the remains of the United Farmers, recognizing the widespread popularity of the Social Credit party, ran joint candidates as independents in what was called the "Independent Movement" or the "Unity Movement".  Although independent candidates won almost as many votes as Social Credit, their support was not concentrated in enough areas to translate into seats.  The Independent Movement lost a number of races by small margins.  However, due to the first past the post system, which awards power solely on the basis of seats won, Social Credit was returned for a second term, albeit with a considerably reduced majority.

The Liberals under leader Edward Gray chose only to support Independent candidates that they played a hand in nominating, and nominated other candidates under its own banner. Gray felt that candidates should not be machined into the field and left it up to the individual Liberal constituency associations to decide if they would support a candidate or not.

This would be the most opposition that Social Credit would face until 1959.

Co-operative Commonwealth
The social democratic Cooperative Commonwealth Federation nominated candidates for the first time, but failed to win any seats in the legislature, despite winning over 10% of the popular vote under the leadership of former United Farmers of Alberta MLA Chester Ronning. Like Ronning, most of the CCF's candidates had run in the 1935 election for the UFA.

Results

Notes:

1 First vote count used.

Members elected
For complete electoral history, see individual districts.

References

Further reading

 

Party platforms

See also
List of Alberta political parties

1940 elections in Canada
1940
1940 in Alberta
March 1940 events